Yebrgual Melese Arage (born Yebrgual Melese 18 April 1990) is an Ethiopian long-distance runner. She placed second at the 2015 Chicago Marathon.

Career
At the 43rd Chevron Houston Marathon in 2016, Yebrgual Melese ran the second-fastest time ever by a woman in Houston.

She smashed the course record at the 19th edition of the Shanghai International Marathon in 2018.

Personal bests

References

External links

 

Living people
1990 births
Ethiopian female long-distance runners
Ethiopian female marathon runners
Ethiopian female cross country runners
Athletes from Addis Ababa
African Games medalists in athletics (track and field)
African Games bronze medalists for Ethiopia
Athletes (track and field) at the 2015 African Games
21st-century Ethiopian women